The electrical system of the International Space Station is a critical resource for the International Space Station (ISS) because it allows the crew to live comfortably, to safely operate the station, and to perform scientific experiments. The ISS electrical system uses solar cells to directly convert sunlight to electricity. Large numbers of cells are assembled in arrays to produce high power levels. This method of harnessing solar power is called photovoltaics.

The process of collecting sunlight, converting it to electricity, and managing and distributing this electricity builds up excess heat that can damage spacecraft equipment. This heat must be eliminated for reliable operation of the space station in orbit. The ISS power system uses radiators to dissipate the heat away from the spacecraft. The radiators are shaded from sunlight and aligned toward the cold void of deep space.

Solar array wing 

Each ISS solar array wing (often abbreviated "SAW") consists of two retractable "blankets" of solar cells with a mast between them. Each wing is the largest ever deployed in space, weighing over 2,400 pounds and using nearly 33,000 solar arrays, each measuring 8-cm square with 4,100 diodes. Each SAW is capable of generating nearly 31 Kilowatts (kW) of direct current power.

Altogether, the eight solar array wings can generate about 240 kilowatts in direct sunlight, or about 84 to 120 kilowatts average power (cycling between sunlight and shade).

The solar arrays normally track the Sun, with the "alpha gimbal" used as the primary rotation to follow the Sun as the space station moves around the Earth, and the "beta gimbal" used to adjust for the angle of the space station's orbit to the ecliptic.  Several different tracking modes are used in operations, ranging from full Sun-tracking, to the drag-reduction mode (night glider and Sun slicer modes), to a drag-maximization mode used to lower the altitude.

Over time, the photovoltaic cells on the wings have degraded gradually, having been designed for a 15-year service life. This is especially noticeable with the first arrays to launch, with the P6 and P4 Trusses in 2000 (STS-97) and 2006 (STS-115).

STS-117 delivered the S4 truss and solar arrays in 2007.

STS-119 (ISS assembly flight 15A) delivered the S6 truss along with the fourth set of solar arrays and batteries to the station during March 2009.

To augment the oldest wings, NASA has launched two pairs and is set to launch one more pair of large-scale versions of the Roll Out Solar Array aboard three SpaceX Dragon 2 cargo launches from early June 2021 to early June 2023, SpaceX CRS-22, CRS-26 and CRS-28. These arrays are intended to be deployed along the central part of the wings up to two thirds of its length. Work to install iROSA's support brackets on the truss mast cans holding the Solar Array Wings was initiated by the crew members of Expedition 64 in late February 2021. After the first pair of arrays were delivered in early June, a spacewalk on 16 June by Shane Kimbrough and Thomas Pesquet  of Expedition 65 to place one iROSA on the 2B power channel and mast can of the P6 truss ended early due to technical difficulties with the array's deployment. 

The 20 June spacewalk saw the first iROSA's successful deployment and connection to the station's power system. The 25 June spacewalk saw the astronauts successfully install and deploy the second iROSA on the 4B mast can opposite the first iROSA.

The next pair of panels were launched on 26 November 2022. Astronauts Josh Cassada and Frank Rubio of Expedition 68 installed each one on the S4 and P4 truss segments on 3 and 22 December 2022, respectively.

Batteries 
Since the station is often not in direct sunlight, it relies on rechargeable lithium-ion batteries (initially nickel-hydrogen batteries) to provide continuous power during the "eclipse" part of the orbit (35 minutes of every 90 minute orbit).

Each battery assembly, situated on the S4, P4, S6, and P6 Trusses, consists of 24  lightweight lithium-ion battery cells and associated electrical and mechanical equipment. This power is fed to the ISS via the BCDU and DCSU respectively. 

The batteries ensure that the station is never without power to sustain life-support systems and experiments. During the sunlight part of the orbit, the batteries are recharged. The nickel-hydrogen batteries and the battery charge/discharge units were manufactured by Space Systems/Loral (SS/L), under contract to Boeing. Ni-H2 batteries on the P6 truss were replaced in 2009 and 2010 with more Ni-H2 batteries brought by Space Shuttle missions. The nickel-hydrogen batteries had a design life of 6.5 years and could exceed 38,000 charge/discharge cycles at 35% depth of discharge. They were replaced multiple times during the expected 30-year life of the station.

From 2017 to 2021, the nickel-hydrogen batteries were replaced by lithium-ion batteries. On January 6, 2017, Expedition 50 members Shane Kimbrough and Peggy Whitson began the process of converting some of the oldest batteries on the ISS to the new lithium-ion batteries. Expedition 64 members Victor J. Glover and Michael S. Hopkins concluded the campaign on February 1, 2021. There are a number of differences between the two battery technologies. One difference is that the lithium-ion batteries can handle twice the charge, so only half as many lithium-ion batteries were needed during replacement. Also, the lithium-ion batteries are smaller than the older nickel-hydrogen batteries. Although Li-Ion batteries typically have shorter lifetimes than Ni-H2 batteries as they cannot sustain as many charge/discharge cycles before suffering notable degradation, the ISS Li-Ion batteries have been designed for 60,000 cycles and ten years of lifetime, much longer than the original Ni-H2 batteries' design life span of 6.5 years.

Power management and distribution 

The power management and distribution subsystem operates at a primary bus voltage set to Vmp, the peak power point of the solar arrays. , Vmp was 160 volts DC (direct current). It can change over time as the arrays degrade from ionizing radiation. Microprocessor-controlled switches control the distribution of primary power throughout the station.

The battery charge/discharge units (BCDUs) regulate the amount of charge put into the battery.  Each BCDU can regulate discharge current from two battery ORUs (each with 38 series-connected Ni-H2 cells), and can provide up to 6.6 kW to the Space Station. During insolation, the BCDU provides charge current to the batteries and controls the amount of battery overcharge. Each day, the BCDU and batteries undergo sixteen charge/discharge cycles. The Space Station has 24 BCDUs, each weighing 100 kg. The BCDUs are provided by SS/L

Sequential shunt unit (SSU) 
Eighty-two separate solar array strings feed a sequential shunt unit (SSU) that provides coarse voltage regulation at the desired Vmp. The SSU applies a "dummy" (resistive) load that increases as the station's load decreases (and vice versa) so the array operates at a constant voltage and load.  The SSUs are provided by SS/L.

DC-to-DC conversion 
DC-to-DC converter units supply the secondary power system at a constant 124.5 volts DC, allowing the primary bus voltage to track the peak power point of the solar arrays.

Thermal control 
The thermal control system regulates the temperature of the main power distribution electronics and the batteries and associated control electronics.  Details on this subsystem can be found in the article External Active Thermal Control System.

Station to shuttle power transfer system 

From 2007 the Station-to-Shuttle Power Transfer System (SSPTS; pronounced spits) allowed a docked Space Shuttle to make use of power provided by the International Space Station's solar arrays. Use of this system reduced usage of a shuttle's on-board power-generating fuel cells, allowing it to stay docked to the space station for an additional four days.

SSPTS was a shuttle upgrade that replaced the Assembly Power Converter Unit (APCU) with a new device called the Power Transfer Unit (PTU). The APCU had the capacity to convert shuttle 28 VDC main bus power to 124 VDC compatible with ISS's 120 VDC power system. This was used in the initial construction of the space station to augment the power available from the Russian Zvezda service module. The PTU adds to this the capability to convert the 120 VDC supplied by the ISS to the orbiter's 28 VDC main bus power. It is capable of transferring up to 8 kW of power from the space station to the orbiter. With this upgrade both the shuttle and the ISS were able to use each other's power systems when needed, though the ISS never again required the use of an orbiter's power systems.

In December 2006, during mission STS-116, PMA-2 (then at the forward end of the Destiny module) was rewired to allow for the use of the SSPTS. The first mission to make actual use of the system was STS-118 with Space Shuttle Endeavour. 

Only Discovery and Endeavour were equipped with the SSPTS. Atlantis was the only surviving shuttle not equipped with the SSPTS, so could only go on shorter length missions than the rest of the fleet.

References

External links
 NASA Glenn Contributions to the International Space Station (ISS) Electrical Power System
 https://ntrs.nasa.gov/citations/20110015485

Components of the International Space Station
Electrical systems
Solar power and space